Craven Arms  is a civil parish in Shropshire, England.  It contains 23 listed buildings that are recorded in the National Heritage List for England.  Of these, two are listed at Grade I, the highest of the three grades, and the others are at Grade II, the lowest grade.  The parish contains the small town of Craven Arms, the hamlets of Halford and Stokesay, and the surrounding countryside.

Craven Arms was a small settlement before the arrival of the railways in 1852, and has since developed into a market town.  The most important buildings in the parish are Stokesay Castle, its gatehouse, and the nearby church, which are listed at Grade I.  Most of the other listed buildings are houses, cottages, farmhouses and farm buildings, many of which are timber framed.  The remaining listed buildings include another church, tombs, memorials and gates in the churchyard of St John the Baptist's Church, a hotel and associated building, a weir and associated structures, a milestone, a former toll house, and two war memorials, one in the form of a lych gate.


Key

Buildings

References

Citations

Sources

Lists of buildings and structures in Shropshire
Listed buildings